"Sticky Icky" is a song by American hip hop recording artist Pitbull featuring vocals from fellow American rapper Jim Jones. It was released on May 15, 2007 as the third single from Pitbull's third studio album The Boatlift. The song was written by Armando C. Pérez, Jonathan Smith and Joseph G. Jones, while the production was handled by Lil Jon.

Credits and personnel
Lead vocals – Pitbull, Jim Jones
Producers – Lil Jon
Lyrics –Armando C. Perez, Jonathan Smith,  Joseph G. Jones
Label: TVT, Bad Boy Latino

Release history

References

2007 singles
2007 songs
Pitbull (rapper) songs
Jim Jones (rapper) songs
TVT Records singles
Song recordings produced by Lil Jon
Songs written by Jim Jones (rapper)
Songs written by Pitbull (rapper)
Songs written by Lil Jon
Songs about cannabis
Crunk songs